AMLI Arc, also known as Tilt 49, is a mixed-use building complex in Seattle, Washington, United States. It consists of two buildings, both facing Boren Avenue between Stewart and Howell streets: a 41-story,  residential skyscraper with 368 apartments to the south; and an 11-story,  office building with retail space to the north. Tilt 49 shares this block with the Kinects residential tower as well as the cancelled Daola Tower.

Developers Touchstone proposed the building in 2014 and bought the site, then a Goodyear Tires store and surface parking lot, for $16.6 million. Construction began in June 2015. In 2017, Amazon.com announced that it had signed a lease for the entire 11-story office portion of Tilt 49.

The residential tower topped out in April 2017, and was completed in November.

The name of the office building, Tilt 49, refers to the 49-degree angle at which the Denny Triangle neighborhood is aligned relative to true north, facing instead towards waterfront property on Elliott Bay owned by Arthur A. Denny (for whom the neighborhood is named).

References

Residential buildings completed in 2017
Denny Triangle, Seattle
Residential skyscrapers in Seattle